Hash key may refer to:

 Number sign, also known as the number, pound or hash key, a key on a telephone keypad
 For its use in data structure, database and cryptographic applications, see hash function or unique key